Roberto D'Aversa (born 12 August 1975) is an Italian football manager and former player, who played as a midfielder and most recently .

Playing career
A Milan youth product, D'Aversa spent most of his playing career with provincial Serie A clubs and in the lower divisions.

In the 2004–05 season, he was banned for six months for match-fixing. Stefano Bettarini, Antonio Marasco, Maurizio Caccavale, Alfredo Femiano and former Siena teammate Generoso Rossi were also banned.

On 28 January 2007, he played his first Serie A match for Messina against Ascoli.

In January 2009, he was loaned from Treviso to Mantova. In July 2009, he was released due to Treviso going bankrupt. On 5 September 2009, he moved to Gallipoli Calcio. On 22 January 2010, he was transferred to Triestina on a six-month contract. In July 2010, he was signed by Virtus Lanciano on a free transfer.

Post-playing and coaching career

Virtus Lanciano
After his retirement, he stayed at Virtus Lanciano as part of the non-playing staff as technical area manager. In July 2014 he was appointed as the club's new head coach to replace Marco Baroni for the 2014–15 Serie B campaign.

After saving Lanciano from relegation in his first season in charge, he was confirmed for the following season. He was sacked on 30 January 2016 after a 0–3 loss to Trapani which left Lanciano in second-last place in the Serie B league table.

Parma
On 3 December 2016, he was named new head coach of Parma following the sacking of Luigi Apolloni and a short caretaker spell of Stefano Morrone for two games.

On his first season, he guided Parma to win the promotion playoffs after defeating Alessandria in the final.

He was confirmed for the club's 2017–18 Serie B season, on which he successfully led Parma to second place and direct promotion to Serie A on their first season in the second division following the club's refoundation, and a third back-to-back promotion in three years (two of which under his tenure). D'Aversa was confirmed head coach also for the 2018–19 Serie A season.

On 23 August 2020, D'Aversa was sacked by Parma with the club citing a lack of unity and enthusiasm for the decision.

On 7 January 2021, D'Aversa was rehired as Parma manager.

Managerial statistics

References

External links
Gazzetta dello Sports player profile 
Roberto D'Aversa at Soccerway

1975 births
Living people
Italian footballers
Italian football managers
A.C. Milan players
Cosenza Calcio 1914 players
A.C. Monza players
Delfino Pescara 1936 players
Ternana Calcio players
U.C. Sampdoria players
A.C.N. Siena 1904 players
A.C.R. Messina players
A.C. Prato players
Treviso F.B.C. 1993 players
Mantova 1911 players
A.S.D. Gallipoli Football 1909 players
S.S. Virtus Lanciano 1924 players
Serie A players
Serie B players
Association football midfielders
Footballers from Stuttgart
S.S. Virtus Lanciano 1924 managers
Parma Calcio 1913 managers